George Allen Beecher (February 3, 1868 - June 14, 1951) was the second and last bishop of the Episcopal Missionary District of Western Nebraska from 1910 to 1943. An alumnus of the University of Nebraska and Philadelphia Divinity School, he was consecrated on November 30, 1910.

External links 

 

1868 births
1951 deaths
American Episcopalians
University of Nebraska alumni
Episcopal bishops of Nebraska